Robert Lee Elder (July 14, 1934 – November 28, 2021) was an American professional golfer. In 1975, he became the first African-American to play in the Masters Tournament, where he missed the cut. Elder was invited to the tournament after he won the 1974 Monsanto Open.

Personal life
One of ten children, Elder was born in Dallas, Texas, to Charles and Almeta Elder. He was nine years old when his father was killed in Germany during World War II, and his mother died three months later. At the age of 12, Elder found himself moving from one ghetto to another before being sent to Los Angeles, California, to live with his aunt. Elder frequently cut classes to work as a caddie, and after two years at Manual Arts High School he dropped out.

Elder met his first wife, Rose Harper, at a golf tournament in Washington, D.C.  The two married in 1966.  After getting married, Rose gave up her golfing career to become his manager.  They later divorced.

Elder died on November 28, 2021, in Escondido, California at the age of 87.

Professional career

Life before the PGA Tour
Elder did not play a full round of 18 holes until he was 16. He took jobs in pro shops and locker rooms, in addition to caddying where he developed his game by watching his clients, and playing when he had the opportunity. Elder's game  developed sufficiently for him to start hustling. His career took a big step after playing a match with heavyweight boxer Joe Louis, which led to Louis’s golf instructor, Ted Rhodes, taking Elder under his wing for three years. Under the tutelage of Rhodes, Elder was able to polish his game and he began playing in tournaments.

In 1959, Elder was drafted into the U.S. Army, and was sent to Fort Lewis, Washington. While at Fort Lewis, Elder had the good fortune to be under the command of Colonel John Gleaster who was an avid golfer. Gleaster put Elder in a Special Services unit, which allowed him the opportunity to play golf on a steady basis.

Elder was discharged from the army in 1961, and joined the United Golf Association Tour (UGA) for black players (at the time they were excluded from the Professional Golfers' Association of America (PGA) which was only "for members of the Caucasian race"). He had a dominant stretch in which he won 18 of 22 consecutive tournaments, but this tour did not have large prizes, often in the range of $500.

The PGA Tour
The PGA lifted its color barrier in 1961, meaning non white players could become members. In 1967 Elder raised enough money to attend qualifying school for the PGA Tour.  He finished 9th out of a class of 122 and gained his tour card for 1968. That year, he placed 40th on the money list, bringing in approximately $38,000. The highlight of Elder's rookie season was a memorable playoff loss to Jack Nicklaus at the American Golf Classic. Elder lost to Nicklaus on the fifth hole of sudden death.

In 1971 Elder accepted a personal invitation from Gary Player to participate in the South African PGA Championship in Johannesburg, South Africa. The event marked the first integrated tournament in the country’s history. The country had apartheid policies in effect at the time, but he agreed to participate after the South African government agreed not to subject him or spectators to the usual segregation requirements. He also played in a number of other tournaments in Southern Africa plus he won the Nigerian Open in 1971.

In 1974, Elder earned his first win on the PGA Tour at the Monsanto Open, which gained him entry to the Masters Tournament in Augusta, Georgia the following April. This marked the first time Augusta National invited a specifically-black golfer to compete in the Masters Tournament since it began in 1934, which coincidentally was Elder's year of birth. The Masters was, in the 1960s and 1970s, frequently 'tweaking' its qualifications for entry. Winners of PGA Tour events were not automatically invited to play at Augusta when Pete Brown and Charlie Sifford won on tour. Brown won twice: once in 1964 and again in 1970. Sifford won in 1967 and again in 1969, but it was not until the early 1970s when Augusta revised its qualifications policy and Elder won Monsanto that a Black golfer was finally invited to play in the Masters.

Elder shot a 74 on day one and a 78 on day two of the 1975 Masters, missing the cut, but the impact of his presence in the field was clear. Elder went on to play in the Masters five more times from 1977 to 1981.

In 1979, he became the first African American to qualify for play in the Ryder Cup.

In 1984, at the age of 50, Elder joined the Senior PGA Tour. He won a total of eight tournaments on the senior tour between 1984 and 1988.

The fight against racism

Life on tour
In 1975, Elder became the first African American to play in the Masters. Leading up to the tournament, he received substantial amounts of hate mail. Fearing for his safety, during the week of the tournament he rented two houses in town and kept moving between them, and always had people around him when he went to eat.

At the Monsanto Open in 1968 in Pensacola, Florida, the same tournament at which he claimed his first PGA Tour victory six years later to qualify for the Masters, Elder and other black players on tour were forced to change their clothes in the parking lot because members of the club would not allow African Americans in their clubhouse.  While playing in a tournament in Memphis, Tennessee, a spectator picked up Elder's ball on a hole and threw it in a hedge. The incident was witnessed by another pro golfer, and Elder was given a free drop.

Elder tried to stay focused on the game, but unlike the majority of players on tour he was constantly bothered by unruly fans, frequently receiving hate mail and threatening phone calls.

Giving back and speaking out
Elder and his then wife, Harper, set up the Lee Elder Scholarship Fund in 1974. This fund was developed to offer monetary aid to low-income young men and women seeking money for college.

In 1986 he protested to the PGA governors for allowing four American golfers to play in a tournament in Sun City, Bophuthatswana, a small area set up by the apartheid regime of South Africa that surrounds it.

In 1990, Elder spoke out against country clubs that still excluded Black golfers from membership. Elder actively promoted Summer Youth Golf Development Programs, raised money for the United Negro College Fund, and served on the advisory boards of Goodwill Industries.

In April 2021, Elder took part in the traditional ceremonial start to the Masters.

Professional wins (16)

PGA Tour wins (4)

PGA Tour playoff record (2–2)

Other wins (2)
1971 Nigerian Open
1984 Jamaica Open

Senior PGA Tour wins (8)

*Note: Tournament shortened to 36 holes due to rain.

Senior PGA Tour playoff record (3–0)

Japan Senior wins (2)
1984 Coca-Cola Grandslam Championship 
1986 Coca-Cola Grandslam Championship

Results in major championships

CUT = missed the halfway cut
"T" indicates a tie for a place

Summary

Most consecutive cuts made – 7 (1978 Masters – 1979 PGA)
Longest streak of top-10s – 0

U.S. national team appearances
Professional
Ryder Cup: 1979 (winners)

See also
 1967 PGA Tour Qualifying School graduates

References

External links

Profile at afrogolf.com

American male golfers
African-American golfers
PGA Tour golfers
PGA Tour Champions golfers
Ryder Cup competitors for the United States
Golfers from Dallas
Golfers from Los Angeles
People from Pompano Beach, Florida
20th-century African-American sportspeople
1934 births
2021 deaths